The Federal Ministry of Interior (FMUP) is the interior ministry of the Federation of Bosnia and Herzegovina entity in Bosnia and Herzegovina.

Internal Organization
Cabinet of Minister
Sector for Administrative Issues
Police Academy
Inspectorate for Supervision of the Agencies for Protection of Persons and Property
Sector for Material-Financial Affairs
Sector for General and Common Affairs
Desk for Professional and Administrative Issues Related to Office for Complaints of Public

Internal Organization of the Federal Police Administration
Under the Ministry itself there is an administration dealing with the police directly which is the
Federal Police Administration:
Cabinet of the Director of Police Administration
Sector for Police Support and Administration
Special Police Unit
Unit for Protection of Persons and Property
Sector of Criminological Police
Center for Forensics and  Support
Unit for Professional Standards
Operative-Communicational Center
Department for Control of Manufacture, Marketing and Transport of Explosive Substances

Activity
preventing and disclosing criminal acts of the international crime and terrorism, unauthorized narcotics trafficking and organized crime and other criminal acts falling under jurisdiction of the Federation of Bosnia and Herzegovina;
tracing and capture of those who committed such criminal acts and their handing over to the relevant authorities;
providing criminological-technical expert opinions;
issues and publishes Interpol's international, Federal and inter-cantonal pursuits;
cooperates with relevant prosecutor's offices related to processing the criminal cases;
The Federation of Bosnia and Herzegovina’s citizenship issues;
providing security services to eligible persons and buildings of the Federation of Bosnia and Herzegovina;
safeguard of human rights and civil freedoms in area of the interior affairs;
transport of explosive substances;
other tasks falling under its competence as established by the law on Interior Affairs and other regulations.

List of ministers

References

External links
Official FMUP website 

Law enforcement agencies of Bosnia and Herzegovina
Federation Bosnia and Herzegovina, Interior
1998 establishments in Bosnia and Herzegovina